On July 26, 2002, John Negroponte, the United States Ambassador to the United Nations, stated (during a closed meeting of the UN Security Council) that the United States will oppose Security Council resolutions concerning the Israeli–Palestinian conflict that condemn Israel without also condemning terrorist groups. This became known as the Negroponte Doctrine, and has been viewed by officials in the United States as a counterweight to the frequent resolutions denouncing Israel that are passed by the UN General Assembly.

Widely reported summaries of Negroponte's statement (an official transcript of these closed-session remarks does not appear to have been released) have stated that for any resolution to go forward, the United States, which has a veto in the 15-nation council, would expect it to have the following four elements:
A strong and explicit condemnation of all terrorism and incitement to terrorism;
A condemnation by name of the al-Aqsa Martyrs' Brigade, Islamic Jihad and Hamas, groups that have claimed responsibility for suicide attacks on Israel;
An appeal to all parties for a political settlement of the crisis;
A demand for improvement of the security situation as a condition for any call for a withdrawal of Israeli armed forces to positions they held before the September 2000 start of the Second Intifada.

See also
Israel–United States relations
Israel and the United Nations
United States and the United Nations

References

External links

Foreign policy doctrines of the United States
Arab–Israeli conflict
United States and the United Nations
Israeli–Palestinian conflict and the United Nations
2002 in the United States
2002 in international relations
Presidency of George W. Bush
Israel–United States relations